The 1950 FIFA World Cup was the fourth edition of the FIFA World Cup, the quadrennial international football championship for senior men's national teams and held in Brazil from 24 June to 16 July 1950. It was the first World Cup tournament in over twelve years, as the 1942 and 1946 World Cups were cancelled due to World War II. Uruguay, who had won the inaugural competition in 1930, defeated the host nation, Brazil, in the deciding match of the four-team group of the final round. This was the only tournament not decided by a one-match final. It was also the inaugural tournament where the trophy was referred to as the Jules Rimet Cup, to mark the 25th anniversary of Jules Rimet's presidency of FIFA.

Host selection

Because of World War II, the World Cup had not been staged since 1938; the planned World Cups of 1942 and 1946 were both cancelled. After the war, FIFA were keen to resurrect the competition as soon as possible, and they began making plans for a World Cup tournament to take place. In the aftermath of the war, much of Europe lay in ruins. As a result, FIFA had some difficulties finding a country interested in hosting the event, since many governments believed that their scarce resources ought to be devoted to more urgent priorities than a sporting celebration.

The World Cup was at risk of not being held for sheer lack of interest from the international community, until Brazil presented a bid at the 1946 FIFA Congress, offering to host the event on condition that the tournament take place in 1950 rather than the originally proposed year of 1949. Brazil and Germany had been the leading bidders to host the cancelled 1942 World Cup; since both the 1934 and 1938 tournaments had been held in Europe, football historians generally agree that the 1942 event would most likely have been awarded to a South American host country. Brazil's new bid was very similar to the mooted 1942 bid and was quickly accepted.

Qualification

Having secured a host nation, FIFA would dedicate some time to persuading countries to send their national teams to compete.
Italy was of particular interest as the long-standing defending champions, having won the two previous tournaments in 1934 and 1938; however, Italy's national team was weakened severely as most of its starting line-up perished in the Superga air disaster one year before the start of the tournament. The Italians were eventually persuaded to attend, but travelled by boat rather than by plane.

Brazil (the host country) and Italy (the defending champion) qualified automatically, leaving 14 places remaining. Of these, seven were allocated to Europe, six to the Americas, and one to Asia.

Former Axis powers
Both Germany (still occupied and partitioned) and Japan (still occupied) were unable to participate. The Japan Football Association (suspended for failure to pay dues in 1945) and the German Football Association (disbanded in 1945 and reorganised in January 1950) were not readmitted to FIFA until September 1950, while the Deutscher Fußball-Verband der DDR in East Germany was not admitted to FIFA until 1952. The French-occupied Saarland had been accepted by FIFA two weeks before the World Cup. This is the most recent World Cup finals not to feature Germany in it.

United Kingdom nations
The "Home" nations were invited to take part, having rejoined FIFA four years earlier, after 17 years of self-imposed exile. It was decided to use the 1949–50 British Home Championship as a qualifying group, with the top two teams qualifying. England finished first and Scotland second.

Teams refusing to participate
A number of teams refused to participate in the qualifying tournament, including most nations behind the Iron Curtain, such as the Soviet Union, 1934 finalists Czechoslovakia, and 1938 finalists Hungary. Ultimately, Yugoslavia was the only Eastern European nation to take part in the tournament.

Withdrawals during qualification
Argentina, Ecuador, and Peru in South America withdrew after the qualifying draw, in Argentina's case because of a dispute with the Brazilian Football Confederation. This meant that Chile, Bolivia, Paraguay, and Uruguay qualified from South America by default. In Asia, the Philippines, Indonesia, and Burma all withdrew, leaving India to qualify by default. In Europe, Austria withdrew, claiming its team was too inexperienced. Belgium also withdrew from the qualification tournament. These withdrawals meant that Switzerland and Turkey qualified without having to play their final round of matches.

Qualified teams and withdrawals after qualification
The following 16 teams originally qualified for the final tournament:

 (hosts)

 (1934 & 1938 champions)

 (withdrew)

 (withdrew)

 (1930 champions)

Before the qualification competition, George Graham, chairman of the Scottish Football Association (SFA), had said that Scotland would only travel to Brazil as winners of the Home Championship (England, by contrast, had committed to attending, even if they finished in second place). After Scotland ended up in second place behind England, the Scottish captain George Young, encouraged by England captain Billy Wright, pleaded with the SFA to change its mind and accept the place in Brazil; however, Graham refused to change his position and so Scotland withdrew from the tournament.

Turkey also withdrew, citing financial conditions that included the cost of travelling to South America. FIFA invited Portugal, Ireland (FAI) and France, who had been eliminated in qualifying, to fill the gaps left by Scotland and Turkey. Portugal and Ireland refused, but France initially accepted and was entered into the draw.

Draw and withdrawals after the draw
The draw, held in Rio on 22 May 1950, allocated the fifteen remaining teams into four groups:

After the draw, the Indian football association, All India Football Federation (AIFF) decided against going to the World Cup, citing travel costs (although FIFA had agreed to bear a major part of the travel expenses), lack of practice time, team selection issues, and valuing the Olympics over the FIFA World Cup. Although FIFA had imposed a rule banning barefoot play following the 1948 Summer Olympics, where India had played barefoot, the Indian captain at the time, Sailen Manna, claimed that this was not part of the AIFF's decision. According to Indian sports journalist Jaydeep Basu, India did not participate because the AIFF did not have confidence in its players.

France also withdrew, citing the amount of travel that would be required between the venues of the Group 4 matches. There was not enough time to invite further replacement teams or to reorganise the groups, so the tournament featured only thirteen teams, with just three nations in Group 3 and two nations in Group 4.

Of the thirteen teams that competed, only one, England, was making its debut. Several of the teams from the Americas teams were competing for the first time since the inaugural 1930 tournament – this included undefeated Uruguay, as well as Mexico, Chile, Paraguay, and Bolivia. Yugoslavia was also making its first appearance since 1930. Spain and the United States qualified for the first time since 1934. This would be the United States' last appearance at the World Cup finals until 1990, and Bolivia's last until 1994.

Format
A new playing format was proposed by the Brazilian organisers of the tournament to maximise matches and ticket sales since the stadium and infrastructure were so costly. The 13 teams were divided into four first-round groups (or "pools" as they were then called) of four teams, with the winner of each group advancing to a final group stage, playing in round-robin format to determine the cup winner. A straight knockout tournament, as had been used in 1934 and 1938, would have featured only sixteen games (including the third-place playoff), while the proposed two rounds of the group format would guarantee thirty games, and thus more ticket revenue. In addition, this format would guarantee each team at least three games, and thus provide more incentive for European teams to make the journey to South America and compete. FIFA originally resisted this proposal, but reconsidered when Brazil threatened to back out of hosting the tournament if this format was not used.

In each group, teams were awarded 2 points for a win and 1 point for a draw. Had there been a tie on points for first place in a group, a playoff would have been held to determine the group winner.

The entire tournament was arranged in such a way that the four first-round groups had no geographical basis. Hence, several teams were obliged to cover large distances to complete their programme, although Brazil was allowed to play two of its three group matches in Rio de Janeiro while its other group game was held in the relatively nearby city of São Paulo.

Summary

A combined Great Britain team had recently beaten the rest of Europe 6–1 in an exhibition match and England went into the competition as one of the favourites; however, they went crashing out after a shock 1–0 defeat by the United States and a 1–0 defeat by Spain. Italy, the defending champions, lost their unbeaten record at the World Cup finals with a 3–2 defeat by Sweden in its opening match and failed to progress to the second round.

The final match in Group 1 between Switzerland and Mexico was the second time a national team did not play in their own kit, the first being 1934 match between Austria and Germany when both teams arrived with white kits, and the Austrians borrowed blue kits from club side Napoli. Both teams arrived with only their red kits, so the Brazilian Football Confederation tossed a coin, with Mexico thus earning the right to play in their own kit, a right they waived as a friendly gesture, allowing the Swiss to wear their own kit while Mexico changed. The local team that lent their shirts was Esporte Clube Cruzeiro from Porto Alegre. The shirts had vertical blue and white stripes.

The final group stage involved the teams that had won their groups: Brazil, Spain, Sweden and 1930 FIFA World Cup champions Uruguay, who were making their first World Cup appearance since winning the inaugural tournament. The World Cup winner would be the team that finished on top of this group. The final group's six matches were shared between Rio de Janeiro and São Paulo. Brazil played all its final group matches at the Estádio do Maracanã in Rio while the games that did not involve the host nation were played in São Paulo.

Brazil won their first two matches with a 7–1 thrashing of Sweden and 6–1 rout of Spain, putting them on top of the group with one game left to play against Uruguay; in second and only a point behind. Brazil had scored 23 goals in the tournament and only conceded four, and so were strong favourites. The two teams had played three matches against each other in the Copa Río Branco, played in Brazil two months previously, with one match won by Uruguay 4–3 and two by Brazil (2–1 and 1–0), who won the tournament. Thus the difference in quality between the teams was not excessive; unlike Spain and Sweden the Uruguayans were used to the challenges in the big South American stadiums.

On 16 July, before a huge home crowd of 199,954 (some estimated as 205,000) in the Estádio do Maracanã, the host nation only had to draw against Uruguay and the trophy would be theirs. After such crushing victories over Spain and Sweden, it looked certain they would take the title, and the home nation duly went ahead in the second minute of the second half, thanks to a goal from Friaça. However, Uruguay equalised and then, with just over 11 minutes left to play, went ahead 2–1 when Alcides Ghiggia squeaked a goal past Moacyr Barbosa, so Uruguay was crowned World Cup champions for a second time. This stunning defeat surprised Brazil to the point of shock and is known as the Maracanazo ("Maracanã blow").

The average attendance of nearly 61,000 per game, aided greatly by eight matches (including five featuring hosts Brazil) held in the newly built Maracanã, set a record that would not be broken until 1994. Not counting the Maracanã matches, the average attendance was a still-impressive 37,500; however, the only venues that saw crowds comparable to or greater than those in recent World Cups were the Maracanã and São Paulo. Other venues saw considerably smaller crowds.

Venues
Six venues in six cities around Brazil hosted the 22 matches played for this tournament. The Maracanã in the then-capital of Rio de Janeiro hosted eight matches, including all but one of the host's matches, including the Maracanazo match in the second round-robin group that decided the winners of the tournament. The Pacaembu stadium in São Paulo hosted six matches; these two stadiums in São Paulo and Rio were the only venues that hosted the second round-robin matches. The Estádio Sete de Setembro in Belo Horizonte hosted three matches, the Durival de Britto stadium in Curitiba and the Eucaliptos stadium in Porto Alegre each hosted two matches, and the Ilha do Retiro stadium in far-away Recife only hosted one match. In order to present itself as a modern country, Brazil invested a today's equivalent of 290 million US-Dollars into new stadiums. The newly built Maracanã cost around 275 million US-Dollars alone.

Squads

Match officials

Europe
  Alois Beranek
  Arthur Edward Ellis
  George Reader
  Reginald Leafe
  Charles de La Salle
  Generoso Dattillo
  Giovanni Galeati
  Karel van der Meer
  José da Costa
  George Mitchell
  José Luis García Carrión
  Ramón Azón Romá
  Gunnar Dahlner
  Ivan Eklind
  Jean Lutz
  Sandy Griffiths
  Leo Lemešić

North America
  Carlos Estévez Tejada
  Prudencio Garcia

South America
  Alfredo Álvarez
  Alberto da Gama Malcher
  Mário Gardelli
  Mário Vianna
  Sergio Bustamante
  Cayetano de Nicola
  Mario Rubén Heyn
  Esteban Marino

First round

Group 1

Group 2

Group 3

 was also drawn into this group, but withdrew before playing.

Group 4

 was also drawn into this group, but withdrew before playing.

Final round

Goalscorers
With nine goals, Brazil's Ademir was the tournament's top scorer. In total, 88 goals were scored by 47 players.

Alcides Ghiggia of Uruguay became the first player ever to score in every game: Just Fontaine would be the second in 1958 and Jairzinho the third (and, as of 2020, the last) in 1970.

9 goals

  Ademir

5 goals

  Óscar Míguez

4 goals

  Chico
  Estanislau Basora
  Telmo Zarra
  Alcides Ghiggia

3 goals

  Karl-Erik Palmér
  Stig Sundqvist
  Juan Alberto Schiaffino

2 goals

  Baltazar
  Jair
  Zizinho
  Atilio Cremaschi
  Riccardo Carapellese
  Silvestre Igoa
  Sune Andersson
  Hasse Jeppson
  Jacques Fatton
  Željko Čajkovski
  Kosta Tomašević

1 goal

  Alfredo
  Friaça
  Maneca
  Andrés Prieto
  George Robledo
  Fernando Riera
  Wilf Mannion
  Stan Mortensen
  Ermes Muccinelli
  Egisto Pandolfini
  Horacio Casarín
  Héctor Ortiz
  Atilio López
  César López Fretes
  Bror Mellberg
  Charles Antenen
  René Bader
  Joe Gaetjens
  Joe Maca
  Gino Pariani
  Frank Wallace
  Julio Pérez
  Obdulio Varela
  Ernesto Vidal
  Rajko Mitić
  Stjepan Bobek
  Tihomir Ognjanov

FIFA retrospective ranking
In 1986, FIFA published a report that ranked all teams in each World Cup up to and including 1986, based on progress in the competition, overall results and quality of the opposition. The rankings for the 1950 tournament were as follows:

Footnotes

Bibliography

External links

 1950 FIFA World Cup on FIFA.com
 Details at RSSSF; note that they often disagree with FIFA on goal scorers and times

 
1950
International association football competitions hosted by Brazil
1950 in Brazilian football
FIFA
FIFA